The Indian Burial Ground is a historic Native American cemetery on Narrow Lane in Charlestown, Rhode Island.  The small cemetery is believed to have been the burying ground for leaders of the Narragansett and Niantic tribes.  It is now fenced off by an iron post and rail fence, erected in the late 19th century.

The cemetery was listed on the National Register of Historic Places in 1970.

See also
 National Register of Historic Places listings in Washington County, Rhode Island

References

External links

 

Narragansett tribe
Algonquian peoples
Cemeteries on the National Register of Historic Places in Rhode Island
Buildings and structures in Charlestown, Rhode Island
Native American cemeteries
National Register of Historic Places in Washington County, Rhode Island